Krutch may refer to:
 Charles Krutch, American photographer
 Joseph Wood Krutch, American author
 Thousand Foot Krutch, a Canadian rock band